Hermannus Jantinus van Veen (born 14 March 1945) is a Dutch stage performer, actor, author, singer-songwriter and musician. He worked with accompanists Laurens van Rooyen and Erik van der Wurff, both were pianist annex composer.

In addition to performing internationally, van Veen is famous as the creator of Alfred J. Kwak (1976). The original one-man theatre show was adapted as a Dutch-German-Japanese cartoon (1989), which was broadcast internationally. In addition to creating the show's story, van Veen also wrote, composed and performed most of the show's music.

He also performed the voice-overs for the characters Johan Sebastian Kwak, Krabnagel de Kater and Professor Paljas (Professor Buffon) in the Dutch and German versions of Alfred J. Kwak.

Discography

Albums
Herman van Veen (II) (1969) NLD No. 6
Carré Amsterdam (1971) NLD No. 2
Carré III - Amsterdam (1976) NLD No. 14
Overblijven (1977)	NLD No. 7	
Op handen	(1978)	NLD No. 23
De wonderlijke avonturen van... (1979)	NLD No. 8
Carré IV - Een voorstelling (1979) NLD No. 24
Uit elkaar (1979) NLD No. 41
Kerstliederen (1979) NLD No. 8	
Iets van een clown	(1981) NLD No. 10
Zolang de voorraad strekt (1982) NLD No. 49
Signalen (984)	NLD No. 2
De wisselaars (1985) NLD No. 32
Anne (1986) NLD No. 10
Carre V - De zaal is er (1987) NLD No. 31
In vogelvlucht - 20 jaar zijn mooiste liedjes (1987) NLD No. 3, BEL No. 39
De Clowns (1988) NLD No. 73
Rode wangen (1989)	NLD No. 72
Blauwe plekken (1990) NLD No. 15
Alfred Jodocus Kwak (1990) NLD No. 32
In vogelvlucht 2 - Zijn mooiste liedjes (1991) NLD No. 26
You Take My Breath Away - Herman van Veen Sings Popclassics (1992) NLD No. 73
Voor wie anders (1993) NLD No. 63
Stille nacht (with Ton Koopman) (1994) NLD No. 27
Sarah (1996) NLD No. 21
De Voetbalsupporter (1996) NLD No. 73
Carré 7 - Alles in de wind (1997) NLD No. 85
Nu en dan - 30 jaar Herman van Veen (1998) NLD No. 11	
Je zoenen zijn zoeter (with The Rosenberg Trio) (1999) NLD No. 16
Carré 8 (2000) NLD No. 78
Er was eens... Herman van Veen zingt en vertelt een kerstverhaal (2001) NLD No. 60
Andere namen (2003) NLD No. 12, BEL No. 36
Vaders (2005) NLD No. 19, BEL No. 52
Chapeau (with Edith Leerkes) (2007) NLD No. 70
Nederlanders (2007) NLD No. 24
100 (2009) NLD No. 7, BEL No. 70
Vandaag (2012) NLD No. 28
Kersvers (2014) NLD No. 2, BEL No. 39
10 keer Herman van Veen - Een keuze (2016) NLD No. 94
Vallen of springen (2017)  NLD No.15, BEL No. 62
Dat kun je wel zien dat is hij (2021) NLD No. 18

Singles

References

External links 
 
 
 Complete discography with pictures

 

1945 births
Living people
Dutch male film actors
Dutch male singer-songwriters
Dutch male voice actors
Dutch violinists
Male violinists
20th-century Dutch male singers
Dutch clowns
Dutch male comedians
Entertainers from Utrecht (city)
Recipients of the Cross of the Order of Merit of the Federal Republic of Germany
21st-century violinists
21st-century Dutch male singers
21st-century Dutch singers